Prue-Anne Reynalds is an Australian Paralympic athlete and cyclist. She competed in the 1984 New York/Stoke Mandeville Paralympics in athletics events as a classified "B1" athlete where she won a bronze in the Women's 3000 m B1 event. She also competed in the mixed tandem open cycling road event at the 1992 Summer Paralympics but did not win a medal.

References

Paralympic athletes of Australia
Athletes (track and field) at the 1984 Summer Paralympics
Cyclists at the 1992 Summer Paralympics
Paralympic bronze medalists for Australia
Visually impaired middle-distance runners
Australian blind people
Living people
Medalists at the 1984 Summer Paralympics
Year of birth missing (living people)
Paralympic medalists in athletics (track and field)
Paralympic cyclists of Australia
Paralympic middle-distance runners